Byron Black and Wayne Black were the defending champions but only Byron competed that year with Fabrice Santoro.

Black and Santoro lost in the semifinals to Tomáš Cibulec and Ota Fukárek.

Mahesh Bhupathi and Leander Paes won in the final 5–7, 6–2, 7–5 against Cibulec and Fukárek.

Seeds

  Mahesh Bhupathi /  Leander Paes (champions)
  Byron Black /  Fabrice Santoro (semifinals)
  František Čermák /  Petr Luxa (semifinals)
  Tomáš Cibulec /  Ota Fukárek (final)

Draw

External links
 2002 Tata Open Doubles Draw

2002 Tata Open
Doubles
Maharashtra Open